Walter Leonard Glenister (30 May 1918 – 12 May 1972) was an Australian rules footballer who played with Footscray in the Victorian Football League (VFL).

Notes

External links 

1918 births
1972 deaths
Australian rules footballers from Victoria (Australia)
Western Bulldogs players
People from Korumburra